Major chess events that took place in 2016 included the Women's World Chess Championship 2016 between Mariya Muzychuk and Hou Yifan, won by Hou Yifan, and the Candidates Tournament, won by Sergey Karjakin, who challenged Magnus Carlsen in the World Chess Championship 2016. Magnus Carlsen won the match on tiebreaks and retained the title of World Chess Champion.

2016 tournaments 

This is a list of significant 2016 chess tournaments:

References

 
21st century in chess
Chess by year